Cavendish Wells Cannon (February 1, 1895 – October 7, 1962) was a long-time United States foreign service officer and diplomat.

During World War II, Cavendish served as the Assistant Chief of the State Department's Division of Southern European Affairs. For a time Cannon's work took him to Syria.

He served as U.S. ambassador to Greece from 1953 to 1956 and ambassador to Morocco from 1956 to 1958. During the late 1940s Cannon served as ambassador to Yugoslavia  Among his fellow ambassadors was the Czechoslovak Ambassador Josef Korbel (father of Madeleine Albright). Cannon spoke in favor of Korbel's pro-democratic leanings when he was trying to gain asylum in the United States. In 1948, he was the chair of the US delegation to the Danube River Conference of 1948.

Cannon was a member of the Church of Jesus Christ of Latter-day Saints.

References

1895 births
1962 deaths
Ambassadors of the United States to Greece
Ambassadors of the United States to Morocco
Ambassadors of the United States to Portugal
Ambassadors of the United States to Syria
Ambassadors of the United States to Yugoslavia
20th-century American diplomats
American Latter Day Saints
Cannon family
American people of Manx descent
United States Foreign Service personnel